The Men's team pursuit at the European Track Championships was first competed in 2010 in Poland. It has formed a part of each championship since. Great Britain, the double Olympic champions, dominated the event in its early years,  winning all of the first five occasions the entered. Thereafter, as other nations caught up, Russia (2), Denmark (3), France (3) and latterly Italy shared the other titles.

Andy Tennant was ever present in each success of the British team, and as a result is the most successful individual rider in the event, with five gold medals.Thomas Denis of France is the most successful non-British rider, with three gold medals.

Format

Until 2014, the team pursuit consisted of two rounds; a qualifying round, followed by a final for the fastest two qualifiers, and the race for the bronze medal for the third and fourth fastest qualifiers. In 2014, a third intermediate round was added: two semifinals consisting of the top four qualifiers to decide the gold medal finalists, and two bronze medal raceoffs for teams placed fifth to eighth which, together with the times of the losing semifinalists, decided the bronze medal finalists.

In that first amended event in 2014, France failed to make the 'gold medal semifinals', but having reached the bronze medal raceoffs as the sixth placed team, raced a quicker time than Switzerland, one of the losing semifinalists, to reach the Bronze medal final; they lost the Bronze medal final to the other losing semifinalist, Russia.

Medalists

References

2010 Results
2011 Results
2012 Results
2014 Results

 
Men's team pursuit
Men's team pursuit (track cycling)